Quinn Farrell (born September 26, 2002) is a United States Virgin Islands soccer player who plays as a defender for United States Virgin Islands national team. He plays college soccer for LSU Eunice Bengals.

Career
Farrell was part of national under-20 team at 2018 CONCACAF U-20 Championship. In March 2021, he received maiden call-up to senior team. He made his senior team debut on March 21, 2021 in a goalless friendly draw against Anguilla.

Personal life
Born in United States Virgin Islands, Farrell relocated to mainland United States in 2017 after Hurricane Irma and Hurricane Maria hit the islands. He is the younger brother of fellow national team player Grant Farrell.

Career statistics

International

References

2002 births
Living people
Association football defenders
United States Virgin Islands soccer players
United States Virgin Islands international soccer players